Sparks is a novel by Ally Kennen, that was published on 4 April 2010. It was longlisted for the Guardian Children's Fiction Prize.

Plot 

When Carla's Grandfather dies, she's very sad. But then, she finds a secret letter by her Grandpa and decides to give him the end he had always wanted, a Viking-funeral, in which he would be put on a burning boat heading to the sea. Carla and her siblings start a crazy and dangerous race against the time to do the impossible.

References

2010 British novels
Novels by Ally Kennen